The men's marathon event at the 1990 Commonwealth Games was held in Auckland, New Zealand on 30 January 1990.

Results

References

Marathon
1990
Comm
1990 Commonwealth Games